Sydney Jordan (born October 1, 1990) is an American politician serving in the Minnesota House of Representatives since 2020. A member of the Democratic–Farmer–Labor Party (DFL), Jordan represents District 60A which includes parts of Minneapolis in Hennepin County, Minnesota.

Early life, education, and career
Jordan was born in Illinois and attended the University of Minnesota, graduating with a B.A. in political science and global studies in 2013.

She has worked for the Minneapolis Federation of Teachers, was the political director for Jacob Frey's first mayoral campaign, and is the state director of Save the Boundary Waters. She advocated against Voter ID requirements during a proposed constitutional amendment campaign.

Minnesota House of Representatives
Jordan was elected to the Minnesota House of Representatives in a special election on February 4, 2020. She won a full term in November of 2020 and was reelected in 2022. Jordan first ran after the death of eight-term DFL incumbent Diane Loeffler, winning the primary election over 10 other candidates. Jordan was endorsed by Minneapolis Mayor Jacob Frey.

Jordan serves as vice chair of the Environment and Natural Resources Finance and Policy Committee, and also sits on the Education Finance, Labor and Industry Finance and Policy, and Rules and Legislative Administration Committees. She is also an assistant majority leader for the House DFL Caucus. From 2021-22, Jordan served as the vice chair of the Legacy Finance Committee, which oversees the allocation of proceeds from a state sales tax increase passed by amendment in 2008.

Jordan has described herself as "staunchly pro-union,” “anti-racist” and “pro-abortion.” She authored legislation to provide a free breakfast and lunch to all students in Minnesota K-12 schools which passed the House floor in February of 2023. The bill eventually passed the Senate, and was signed into law by Governor Tim Walz on March 17, 2023. Jordan also carried a bill that would require school districts have a comprehensive sexual health education program in elementary and secondary grades.

Jordan supported voting "yes" on City Question 2, which would have renamed the Minneapolis Police Department to the Minneapolis Department of Public Safety, removed minimum staffing levels for sworn officers, and shifted oversight of the new agency from the mayor’s office to the city council. After the police killing of Winston Smith, where federal officers without body cameras killed a Minneapolis man, Jordan stated that every officer in Minnesota should have a body camera. Jordan signed on to a letter written by U.S. Representative Ilhan Omar asking the Department of Justice to expand their investigation into the Minneapolis Police Department following the murder of George Floyd. 

Jordan signed on to a letter calling on the Biden administration to stop Line 3, a tar sands pipeline proposed to cut through Minnesota tribal lands. She joined environmental advocates pushing for the closing of a metal shredder in North Minneapolis after a stockpile caught on fire.

After the Russian invasion of Ukraine in 2022, Jordan led efforts to divest millions from state pension funds tied to Russia. A large number of Ukrainians live in northeast Minneapolis. During the COVID-19 pandemic, Jordan authored legislation requiring face masks for anyone six or older when indoors at a business or public setting–the bill did not become law.

Electoral history

Personal life
Jordan resides in the Northeast Park neighborhood in Northeast Minneapolis.

References

External links

 Official House of Representatives website
 Official campaign website

Living people
Democratic Party members of the Minnesota House of Representatives
Politicians from Minneapolis
21st-century American women politicians
21st-century American politicians
Women state legislators in Minnesota
Year of birth missing (living people)